Fort Mont-Valérien (French: Forteresse du Mont-Valérien) is a fortress in Suresnes, a western Paris suburb, built in 1841 as part of the city's ring of modern fortifications. It overlooks the Bois de Boulogne.

History
Before Thiers built the fortress, Mont Valérien was home to hermits. Since the 15th century a community of hermits lived on the slope of Puteaux similar to the one of Chartreux: private cells, communal holy Mass and holy Office, perpetual silence. Manual labor and prayer divided the days equally.

The fortress defended Paris during the Franco-Prussian War, and remained the strongest fortress protecting the city, withstanding artillery bombardments that lasted several months. The surrender of the fortress was one of the main clauses of the armistice signed by the Government of National Defense with Otto von Bismarck on 17 January 1871, allowing the Germans to occupy the strongest part of Paris' defences in exchange for shipments of food into the starving city.

Mont-Valèrien played a key role in the Paris Commune in 1871. The National Guard failed to secure it after the first withdrawal of the regular army from Paris. After their return on March 21, the army used the fort as an important base for the subjugation of the Commune during the Semaine Sanglante, or 'Bloody Week.'

Colonel Henry of army intelligence, a key player in the Dreyfus affair, was confined at the prison of Mont Valérien in 1898.  The day after being confined, 31 August 1898, he cut his throat with a razor that had been left in his possession, taking to the grave his secret and that of a great part of the affaire Dreyfus. (See Resolution of the Dreyfus affair.)

During the Second World War, the fortress was used, from 1940 to 1944, as a prison and place of execution by the Nazi occupiers of Paris. The Germans brought prisoners to the prison in trucks from other locations. The prisoners were temporarily confined in a disused chapel, and later taken to be shot in a clearing 100 metres away. The bodies were then buried in various cemeteries in the Paris area. More than 1,000 (some figures say 4,500) hostages and resistants were executed by the Nazis.

Executions during World War II
The 1,014 recorded executions by the Wehrmacht at Mont-Valérien between 1941 and 1944 were all men as a French law, observed by the Germans, prohibited execution of women by firing squad. Olga Bancic, condemned to death as a member of the Affiche Rouge group, was then deported to Stuttgart where she was beheaded by axe. The immense majority were members of the French Resistance, including:
Henri Honoré d'Estienne d'Orves, 29 August 1941;
Gabriel Péri, 15 December 1941, among a group of 70 men (including 53 Jews) shot that same day;
7 members of the Groupe du musée de l'Homme, 23 February 1942: Boris Vildé, Anatole Lewitsky, Pierre Walter, Léon-Maurice Nordmann, Georges Ithier, Jules Andrieu, and René Sénéchal;
Georges Paulin, 21 March 1942;
Georges Politzer, 23 May 1942
Jacques Decour, 30 May 1942
Valentin Feldman, 27 July 1942, who shouted to the German soldier before being shot : "Imbéciles, I am dying for you too!"
Nicolae Cristea, 9 March 1943
Missak Manouchian, Joseph Boczov, Léon Goldberg, Thomas Elek and 19 other members of the Affiche Rouge group, 21 February 1944;
Joseph Epstein, 11 April 1944;
93 prisoners, 11 August 1944, the largest and last sorted execution at Mont-Valérien.

Memorial

The site now serves as a national memorial. On 18 June 1945, Charles de Gaulle consecrated the site in a public ceremony.

The area in front of the "Mémorial de la France combattante", a reminder of the French Resistance against the German occupation forces, has been named Square Abbé Franz Stock. During the German occupation, Stock took care of condemned prisoners here, and he mentioned 863 executions at Mont Valérien in his diary.

There is also an American military cemetery on the site, which contains the remains of 1,541 American soldiers who died in France during the First World War.

Notes

Sources 
Order of the Liberation
Le Mont-Valerien website

Mont-Valerien
Defunct prisons in Paris
History of Hauts-de-Seine
Buildings and structures in Hauts-de-Seine
Dreyfus affair
1841 establishments in France
Monuments and memorials in France
World War II memorials in France
Tourist attractions in Île-de-France
Tourist attractions in Hauts-de-Seine
Buildings and structures completed in 1841
Suresnes
19th-century architecture in France